Samuel Wendpagnangdé Ouedraogo (born March 15, 1987) is a Burkinabé former basketball player who plays both the power forward and center positions.

He is a two times defensive player of the year and once led the NCAA II in both rebounds per game and offensive rebounds per game. He also has an international experience playing in the FIBA Afrobasket.

Biography
Ouedraogo is the oldest son from a family of nine children. Soon after his arrival in the United States in December 2009, he started getting a lot of attention from scouts, landing multiple scholarship offers even though. He is from Ouagadougou, the capital city of Burkina Faso.

College career
Ouedraogo won two conference team titles in the NAIA. He also played in the NCAA for Bluefield State College in West Virginia, where he dominated the nation in total rebounds( 12.5 RPG) and offensive rebounds (5.2 RPG) over his junior year. Previously during his sophomore year, he got selected to play for the Burkina Faso national team at the FIBA Afrobasket

Ouedraogo participated at the NAIA national tournament with Daemen College from New York during his freshman year in 2012 and with Louisiana State University at Alexandria for his senior year in 2015.

On January 21, 2013, Ouedraogo beat an ASRC arena's 11 years old record in rebounds against West Liberty University, while playing at Bluefield State College. 11 of his 19 rebounds that night were offensive rebounds. He had a career high  and school record of 25 rebounds (12 offensive rebounds) on November 20, 2013 against West Virginia State University

Ouedraogo graduated from college in 2015 at Louisiana State University at Alexandria

Professional career
Ouedraogo went undrafted during the 2015 NBA Draft.

In 2020, Ouedraogo was selected to be part of Ice Cube's BIG3 Basketball League. The draft class was filled with a lot of NBA alumni  including the likes of Metta World Peace, Jordan Hill , Renaldo Balkman, Jason Maxiell, Mamadou N'diaye, Ryan Hollins, DeShawn Stevenson, Isaiah Austin etc. 
Ouedraogo went undrafted.

International career

Ouedraogo is a member of the Burkina Faso National Basketball Team. He played in the FIBA afrobasket tournament in 2013 in Abidjan, Ivory Coast.

References

1987 births
Living people
Bluefield State College alumni
Burkinabé men's basketball players
Burkinabé expatriate sportspeople in the United States
Expatriate basketball people in the United States
Sportspeople from Ouagadougou
Power forwards (basketball)
Centers (basketball)
21st-century Burkinabé people